O Silêncio Q Precede O Esporro is the fifth album by Brazilian band O Rappa, released in 2003. It was produced by Tom Capone and O Rappa, as well as being the first album without the founding member, drummer and lyricist Marcelo Yuka, with the drums took over by the keyboardist Marcelo Lobato and the lyrics by his brother Marcos, and Marcelo Falcão. It is distributed through Warner Music.

Track listing
"0'52" - 0:52
"Reza Vela" - 4:56
"0'05" - 0:05
"Rodo Cotidiano" – 6:13
"Papo De Surdo E Mudo" – 5:41
"0'04" - 0:04
"Bitterusso Champagne" - 6:50
"0'04" - 0:04
"Mar De Gente" - 5:35
"O Salto" - 6:17
"1'46" - 1:46
"Linha Vermelha" - 3:30
"Pára Pegador" - 4:18
"1'15" - 1:08
"0'21" – 0:21
"0'14" – 0:14
"Óbvio" - 4:17
"0'41" - 0:41
"Maneiras" - 4:15
"O Novo Já Nasce Velho" - 4:11
"Deus Lhe Pague" - 3:28
"1'38" - 1:38
"O Salto II" - 3:23

Personnel 
O Rappa
 Marcelo Falcão — vocals, acoustic guitar
 Xandão — electric and acoustic guitars
 Lauro Farias — electric bass, synth bass
 Marcelo Lobato — drums, keyboards, tubular bells, harmonium

Special participation
 Malena D'Álessio — rapping in "Óbvio"
 Zeca Pagodinho — guest vocals in "Maneiras"
 Waly Salomão — voice, bass, texts and poems on "O Salto"

Guest musicians
 Tom Capone — additional effects
 DJ Negralha — scratches on "Pára Pegador", "Rodo Cotidiano", "Linha Vermelha", "O Salto", "Deus Lhe Pague", "Papo de Surdo e Mudo", "O Novo Já Nasce Velho" and "Mar de Gente",
 DJ Nuts — scratches on "Óbvio"
 Cleber Sena and Paulo Negueba - percussion on "O Novo Já Nasce Velho"
 Gustaco da Lua — percussion on  "Maneiras"
 Marcos Lobato — banjo and dobro in the songs "O Salto II", "Bitterusso Champagne" and "Óbvio"
 Zequinha Pagodinho — cavaquinho in "Maneiras"
 Marcelo Lobato e Glauco Fernandes — string arrangements on "O Salto"

Orchestra in "O Salto", "Deus Lhe Pague" e "O Salto II"
 Glauco Fernandes — violin solo
 Glauco Fernandes, Daniel Nogueira, Léo Ortiz, Pedro Mibielli, Her Agapite, Flávio Gomes, Carlos Mendes, Erasmo Fernandes, Marluce Ferreira, Rogério Rosa, Rodolfo Toffolo and Veronica Gabler — violins
 Flávia Motta, Isabela Passaroto, Jairo Diniz and Eduardo Pereira — violas
 Marcelo Salles, Luiz Zamith, Lui Coimbra and Claudia Salles — cellos

References

O Rappa albums
2003 albums